Hava or HAVA may refer to:
 Eve, according to the creation myth of Abrahamic religions, the first woman created by God
 Hava, Iran, a village in East Azerbaijan Province, Iran
 Helmand and Arghandab Valley Authority, an economic development agency of the Afghan government
 Help America Vote Act, a United States election law
 Monsoon HAVA, a video streaming device
 Hava or Chava, Hebrew version of the name Eve
 Hava (musician), German rapper and singer

tr:Hava